The Jaivana Cannon (Hindi: जयवाण) is a large 18th-century cannon preserved at Jaigarh Fort, in Rajasthan, India. At the time of its manufacture in 1720, it was the world's largest cannon on wheels of the Early Modern Era.

History
The Jaivana was manufactured during the reign of Maharaja Sawai Jai Singh II (1699–1743) at a foundry in Jaigarh. The cannon was never used in any battle, as the Rajput rulers of Amer had friendly relations with the Mughals. It is said that the projectile fired from it made a small lake in Chaksu.

Technical data

The thickness gradually increases as one moves towards the rear of the barrel. The two thick rings on the barrel were used for lifting it with the help of a crane which, though incomplete, is still lying in Jaigarh. A  elevating screw was used for raising and lowering the barrel.

The barrel has floral design. An elephant rests on the tip of the barrel and a pair of peacocks are carved in the centre. A pair of ducks also decorates the rear of the barrel.

Jaivana rests on a high two-wheeled carriage. The carriage is equipped with two removable additional wheels for transport. It is mounted on wheels and has the mechanism of two back wheels mounted on roller pin bearings, to turn it 360° and fire in any direction. A tin shed was built to protect the cannon against weather. 

About  of gunpowder fired a shot ball weighing .

The uses and range of the cannon and cannonballs vary over different sources.

The Jaivana Cannon was only fired once by Jai Singh II, as a test-fire in 1720 and the then Mughal Emperor Muhammad Shah is known to have attended the event before ousting the Sayyid Brothers from power. Most sources, including local tourist guides agree that it was fired in the direction of Chaksu. The impact is said by many locals and tourist guides to be powerful enough to have caused a depression where a pond can be seen today. Legend has it that after it fired, pregnant women living nearby suffered miscarriages.

See also

Tsar Cannon
List of the largest cannon by caliber
The Pride and the Passion, a 1957 fictional historical film drama with a large siege cannon that has a nearly identical carriage and similar size barrel.

References

Further reading 

 R.S. Khangarot, P.S. Nathawat- Jaigarh the invincible fort of Amber(1990), Raj Kmar Parnami, RBSA Publishers, Jaipur

http://www.journeymart.com/DExplorer/AsiaIS/India/india_addon/fortspalaces/jaigarh.asp

Large-calibre artillery
Artillery of India
History of Jaipur
Individual cannons